Forests cover about one-third of Ghana's total area, with commercial forestry concentrated in the southern parts of Ghana.

History
The forestry sector of Ghana accounted for 4.2 percent of GDP in 1990; timber was the country's third largest foreign exchange earner. Since 1983 forestry has benefited from more than US$120 million in investments and has undergone substantial changes, resulting in doubled earnings between 1985 and 1990. In 1993 timber and wood products earnings totaled US$140 million against a targeted level of US$130 million. Between January and November 1994, exports amounted to 919,000 tons and earned US$212 million.

Until the 1980s, forestry production suffered because of the overvalued cedi and deterioration of the transportation infrastructure. Log production declined by 66 percent during 1970- 81 and sawed timber by 47 percent. Exports fell from US$130 million in 1973 to US$15 million in 1983, and four nationalized firms went bankrupt during that period. The forestry sector was given a large boost in 1986, with a US$24 million timber rehabilitation credit, which financed imports of logging equipment. As a consequence, log production rose 65 percent in 1984–87, and export revenues rose 665 percent in 1983–88. Furthermore, the old Ghana Timber Marketing Board was disbanded and replaced by two bodies, the Timber Export Development Board—responsible for marketing and pricing, and the Forest Products Inspection Bureau—responsible for monitoring contracts, maintaining quality standards, grading products, and acting as a watchdog for illegal transactions. Some of the external financing underwrote these institutional changes, while much of the rest financed forestry management and research as well as equipment for logging, saw milling, and manufacturing.

The sector, however, faced several problems. The most important was severe deforestation. A century ago, Ghana's tropical hardwood forest extended from about the middle of the country southward to the sea. Moreover, nearly half the country was covered with forests, which included 680 species of trees and several varieties of mahoganies. Most of this wood has been cut. By the early 1990s, only about one-third of the country was still forested, and not all of this was of commercial value. This situation has forced the government to make difficult choices between desperately needed hard currency earnings and conservation. The Forest Resource Management Project, part of the economic recovery program (ERP), was initiated in 1988, and in 1989 the government banned log exports of eighteen species. The government later extended the list and imposed high duties on other species, planning to phase out log and air-dried timber exports altogether by 1994.

Instead, the government hoped to increase sales of wood products to replace earnings from logs. Government figures showed that one cubic meter of lumber and plywood was worth more than twice as much as the same amount of logs; veneers earned five times as much; and other products, such as furniture and floorings, earned six times the price of an equivalent volume of logs. Improvements in the processing sector caused wood products (excluding lumber) to rise to about 20 percent of export earnings in 1991, accounting for 6.9 percent of volume exports. By comparison, wood products represented 11 percent of earnings and 5.5 percent of volume in 1985. The fall in the proportion of volume sales accounted for by logs was accompanied by a dramatic fall in their share in earnings, from 50 to 60 percent in the mid-1980s to 23 percent in 1990.

Overview

There were about 220 lumber processors in Ghana at the beginning of the 1990s, but the sector was subject to a number of limitations. Kiln-dried goods are in high demand abroad, but Ghanaian producers couldn't keep up with demand due to a lack of kilns. Because air-dried wood tends to become unstable over time, the inexpensive air-dried processing method was not satisfactory. Incentives for foreign investment were less alluring in this industry than they were in others, like mining. In addition, compared to mining and cocoa production regions, the Western Region, where lumber processing is located, continued to have relatively neglected infrastructure. Lack of managerial and technological expertise are among the other challenges.

Scandals have been reported in Ghana's forestry industry since 1986, and they erupted again in early 1992. The most notable case involved African Timber and Plywood, once Ghana's largest exporter of round logs. In the mid-1980s, the government embarked on a US$36 million rehabilitation project to boost the company's production. In 1992 as much as US$2.3 million was alleged to have been siphoned off from the project through various malpractices, and a number of officials were arrested. Furthermore, the environmental group, Friends of the Earth, alleged that there had been additional thefts by foreign companies totaling almost US$50 million in hard currency during the 1980s. In 1992 the government began investigating the activities of hundreds of companies, both foreign and local, that were alleged to have entered into a range of illegal dealings including smuggling, fraudulent invoicing, violation of local currency regulations, corruption, bribery, and nonpayment of royalties. The corruption is so widespread, however, that it remains to be seen on whether the Ghanaian authorities will stop timber-related crimes anytime soon.

See also
 Agriculture in India
 Economy of Ghana

References

External links 
 

 
Economy of Ghana
Environmental issues in Ghana